Cotana erectilinea is a moth in the family Eupterotidae. It was described by George Thomas Bethune-Baker in 1910. It is found in New Guinea.

The wingspan is about 44 mm. The forewings are pale ochreous brown, with a small pale spot darkly encircled in the cell near the base, as well as an erect straight dark median line, beyond which the postmedian area is darker and terminates in a scalloped edge. The apex is also darker. The hindwings are pale orange-brown, with a trace of a darker median and curved postmedian line.

References

Moths described in 1910
Bombycoidea